Astilbe simplicifolia, the entire-leaved astilbe, is a species of flowering plant in the genus Astilbe, native to Japan and North Korea. The Latin specific epithet simplicifolia is in reference to its leaves which are simple. It and its hybrid cultivars 'Atrorosea', 'Bronce Elegans' and 'Sprite' have gained the Royal Horticultural Society's Award of Garden Merit.

References

simplicifolia
Flora of Japan
Flora of North Korea
Plants described in 1893